Ahmedabad is a village and union council of Jhelum District in the Punjab Province of Pakistan. It is part of Pind Dadan Khan Tehsil, and is located at 32°40'0N 73°20'0E with an altitude of 215 metres (708 feet).Ahmedabad  located on the bank of River Jhelum, about07 km kilometres from the M2 motorway Lilah Inter change and about 30 km from Pind Dadan Khan Tehsil and 36 km from Khewra Salt Mines. Ahmadabad is a major Khokhar and Awan settlement in Jhelum District. Last Chairman of Union Council Ahmedabad Was Malik Liaqat Awan from Kotla Sayedan. Saluhana Awan mostly lived in Kotla Sayedan.

Athar was part of union council Ahmedabad. Now it is part of union council Tobah. Villages of Union Council Ahmedabad, Mandhar, Langr, Malyar, Bhana, Kotlan Syedan, Syed Rehman, Jndran, Meery.

History

References

Populated places in Tehsil Pind Dadan Khan
Union councils of Pind Dadan Khan Tehsil